Vibeke Johnsen (born 16 October 1968) is a Norwegian team handball player and Olympic medalist. She received a silver medal at the 1988 Summer Olympics in Seoul with the Norwegian national team. She played 24 games for the national team during her career, between 1987 and 1991.

References

External links

1968 births
Living people
Norwegian female handball players
Olympic silver medalists for Norway
Olympic medalists in handball
Medalists at the 1988 Summer Olympics
Handball players at the 1988 Summer Olympics
20th-century Norwegian women